Telosentis is a genus of acanthocephalans. The representatives of the genus are distributed in tropical waters of Indian ocean, Pacific coast of Australia and Mediterranean. Consists of four species:

 Telosentis australiensis Edmond, 1964
 Telosentis exiguus (von Linstow, 1901)
 Telosentis lutianusi Gupta & Gupta, 1990
 Telosentis mizellei Gupta & Fatma, 1988

References

Illiosentidae
Acanthocephala genera